From Afar may refer to:

 From Afar (album) by Ensiferum, 2009
 From Afar (song), by Vance Joy, 2013
 From Afar (film), a 2015 Venezuelan film